The Rocky Mountain Junior Hockey League was a Canadian Junior "A" ice hockey league in British Columbia.

Peace Junior B Hockey League 19xx–1975
Peace-Cariboo Junior Hockey League 1975–1991
Rocky Mountain Junior Hockey League 1991–1999

History
In 1975, the Quesnel Millionaires and Prince George Spruce Kings joined the Peace Junior B Hockey League.  The PJBHL already included the Fort St. John Huskies, Dawson Creek Canucks, and Grande Prairie North Stars.  Previously, Fort St. John won the Cyclone Taylor Cup as British Columbia Jr. B Champions in 1969 as a member of the Peace Jr. B League.  With the expansion, the PJBHL became the Peace-Cariboo Junior Hockey League.  The first championship of the new PCJHL was won by Prince George, but Quesnel won the league and the Cyclone Taylor Cup as BC Champions in 1977, 1978, and 1979 and the Grande Prairie North Stars won the Russ Barnes Trophy and Alberta champions in 1976.

In 1980 the PCJHL became a Junior "A" League, one season after the British Columbia Junior Hockey League-Pacific Coast Junior Hockey League merger.  The league's most successful team, by far, was the Prince George Spruce Kings. Every season, their playoff champion earned the right to play for the Mowat Cup, the British Columbia Junior "A" Title.  The PCJHL/RMJHL was eligible for the Royal Bank Cup, the Junior "A" National Title.

In 1991, the Peace Cariboo league doubled in size when it took in a portion of the Jr. B Kootenay International Junior Hockey League and renamed itself the Rocky Mountain league.  The original teams to the North would form the Peace-Cariboo Division, while the newer teams to the South would form the Kootenay Division.

In 1995, the Trail Smoke Eaters walked away from the league and joined the British Columbia Hockey League.  In 1996, the league was reduced to the Kootenay Division members, when the entire Peace-Cariboo Division lost all its members: Prince George Spruce Kings and Quesnel Millionaires jumped to the BCHL, the Grande Prairie Chiefs jumped to the Alberta Junior Hockey League, the Williams Lake Mustangs went defunct, and the Fort St. John Huskies jumped to Hockey Alberta's North West Junior Hockey League.

To fill the void left when the Peace-Cariboo Division folded in 1996, the Castlegar Rebels joined the fold.  In 1998, however, the Rebels would return to the KIJHL and the Cranbrook Colts would fold to make way for the Western Hockey League's Kootenay Ice.  Left with 4 teams, the 4 teams of the RMJHL (Creston Valley Thunder, Kimberley Dynamiters, Nelson Leafs, and Fernie Ghostriders) played an interlocking schedule with the America West Hockey League of USA Hockey.  On February 12, 1999, the commissioner of the RMJHL, Bronco Horvath, presented a letter to the management of the British Columbia Hockey League proposing the four remaining teams join the BCHL as a "Kootenay Division".  The proposal was universally rejected by the BCHL.  After the 1998-99 season, Creston took a one-year hiatus which forced the RMJHL to fold.  Nelson jumped to the KIJHL.  Kimberley and Fernie outright joined the AWHL for the 1999-00 season and Kimberley left for the KIJHL in 2001, while Fernie moved to the North American Hockey League in 2003 before joining the KIJHL in 2004.  Creston returned to hockey after one year off in 2000 with the KIJHL.

The Mowat Cup
The Mowat Cup is the championship trophy of Junior A hockey in British Columbia.  For 19 years, starting in 1981, the champion of the RMJHL was forced to square off against the champion of the British Columbia Hockey League for the right to face the Alberta Junior Hockey League champion in the Doyle Cup.  In the end, the BCHL had a virtually spotless record against the RMJHL, winning all 19 Mowat Cups and compiling a record 48 wins and 1 loss in that time frame.  In fact, until the 1999 Mowat Cup (the final year of the RMJHL's existence), no BCHL champion had ever lost a playoff game against a RMJHL champion.  In the 1999 Mowat Cup, the Kimberley Dynamiters were able to snap the losing streak against the BCHL's Vernon Vipers before losing the series.

Teams

Champions
From its founding until 1991, the league's champion was awarded the PCJHL Trophy.  From 1992 until 1996, the league's champion was awarded the Citizen Cup.  From 1997 until 1999, the league's champion was awarded the Subway/Eddie Mountain Trophy.

See also
Canadian Junior A Hockey League
Royal Bank Cup
Memorial Cup
Hockey Canada
British Columbia Hockey League
Kootenay International Junior Hockey League

References

External links
Vernon Junior A Hockey History

Defunct ice hockey leagues in British Columbia
1999 disestablishments in British Columbia
Sports leagues disestablished in 1999